Wu Yigong (1 December 1938 – 14 September 2019) was a Chinese film director and producer.

Biography
Born in Hangzhou, Zhejiang Province, Wu Yigong enrolled in the directing department of the Beijing Film Academy in 1956. After graduation in 1960, he was appoint as director assistant in Shanghai Haiyan Film Factory.

His first solo film, My Memories of Old Beijing (城南旧事), won the 3rd Golden Rooster Award for best director. His other films include Evening Rain (巴山夜雨) (1st Golden Rooster Award for best motion picture) (co-directed with Wu Yonggang), The Tribulations of a Young Master (少爷的磨难), and A Confucius Family (阙里人家), among others.

Wu served as the president of the Shanghai Film Studio, as well as the general manager of the General Shanghai Film Corporation and the president of the Shanghai Film Bureau.

He joined CPC in June 1985, and was an alternate member of 14th and 15th Central Committees of Communist Party of China.

Wu died on 14 September 2019 in Ruijin Hospital, Shanghai. He was 80 years old.

Filmography (as director)

References

External links

Wu Yigong at the Chinese Movie Database

Film directors from Zhejiang
Beijing Film Academy alumni
Artists from Hangzhou
1938 births
2019 deaths
Chinese film producers
Chinese film directors